Ilex crenata, the Japanese holly or box-leaved holly (Japanese: イヌツゲ inutsuge) is a species of flowering plant in the family Aquifoliaceae, native to eastern China, Japan, Korea, Taiwan, and Sakhalin.

It is an evergreen shrub or small tree growing to a height of 3–5 m (rarely 10 m) tall, with a trunk diameter up to 20 cm. The leaves are glossy dark green, small, 10–30 mm long and 10–17 mm broad, with a crenate (wavy) margin, sometimes spiny. The plants are dioecious (having separate male and female plants), with white, four-lobed flowers. The fruit is a black drupe (stone fruit) 5 mm diameter, containing four seeds. It grows well in acidic soil, between a pH of 3.7 and 6.0.

Cultivation

Ilex crenata is grown as an ornamental plant for its dense evergreen foliage, and is a popular plant among bonsai enthusiasts. It is superficially similar in appearance to boxwood (box), and is often used in similar situations, such as low hedging; but it can readily be distinguished from boxwood by its alternate, not opposite, leaf arrangement.

Numerous cultivars have been selected, including plants with the leaves variegated (e.g. 'Golden Gem', 'Shiro-Fukurin'), dark green (e.g. 'Green Lustre'), or greyish-green (e.g. 'Bad Zwischenahn'); with yellow fruit (e.g. 'Ivory Hall'); and with an erect habit (e.g. 'Chesapeake'), spreading (e.g. 'Green Island', 'Hetzii'), or dwarf (e.g. 'Mariesii', 'Stokes'). The cultivars 'Golden Gem' and ‘Fastigiata’ (Fastigiata Group) have gained the Royal Horticultural Society's Award of Garden Merit.

References

crenata
Flora of Asia
Garden plants